Matt Noble (born 23 November 1988) is an English footballer, who plays for Rochedale Rovers Football Club. He was voted Doncaster Rovers Youth Player of the Season at the end of the 2006-07 season after making impressive performances in youth and reserve teams.

The 2007-08 season was Noble's first season as a full-time professional footballer after he signed his first professional contract at the end of the 2006-07 campaign, making the bench on three separate occasions during Doncaster Rovers' promotion season. During the 2007–08 season, Noble was loaned out to Guiseley.

Noble joined Gateshead at the beginning of the 2008-09 season after a successful pre-season trial period. He joined Spennymoor Town in September 2008, initially on loan, after only being named on the bench once in the first two months of the season at Gateshead. On 6 February 2011 signed for Rochedale Rovers Football Club.

External links
 Spennymoor Town Pen-Pics

References

1988 births
Living people
English footballers
Association football defenders
English expatriate sportspeople in Australia
English expatriate footballers
Expatriate soccer players in Australia
Doncaster Rovers F.C. players
Guiseley A.F.C. players
Gateshead F.C. players
Spennymoor Town F.C. players
National League (English football) players
Northern Premier League players
Northern Football League players